China Fortune International Trust Co., Ltd. known as China Fortune Trust is a Chinese investment management company which license to create private equity fund (as trust). The company is a wholly owned subsidiary of state-owned China Huadian Corporation.

History
China Fortune International Trust Co., Ltd. was re-registered on 24 December 2008, after Huadian acquired the license from dormant company Foshan International Trust Investment Co., Ltd.. The company was also relocated from Foshan to Beijing.

Private equity funds
 Xinbao N°47 Trust: 99.67% stake of Taishan Huacheng Technology (a shareholder of Puhua Investment and Taian Bank) as pledge,  borrowed to Jiexintai.

References

External links
  

Financial services companies of China
Private equity firms of China
Companies based in Beijing
Chinese companies established in 2008
Government-owned companies of China